Ja'Von Rolland-Jones (born November 3, 1994) is an American football outside linebacker who is currently a free agent. He played college football at Arkansas State.

Professional career

Cincinnati Bengals
Rolland-Jones was signed by the Cincinnati Bengals as an undrafted free agent on May 11, 2018.

Los Angeles Rams
On October 2, 2018, Rolland-Jones was signed to the Los Angeles Rams practice squad. He was released on November 6, 2018.

Baltimore Brigade
On April 22, 2019, Rolland-Jones was assigned to the Baltimore Brigade.

References

External links
Arkansas State Red Wolves bio

1994 births
Living people
Arkansas State Red Wolves football players
Cincinnati Bengals players
Los Angeles Rams players
Mesquite High School (Texas) alumni
Baltimore Brigade players
American football outside linebackers